The Addis Ababa Agreement, also known as the Addis Ababa Accord, was a set of compromises within a 1972 treaty that ended the First Sudanese Civil War  (1955–1972) fighting in Sudan. The Addis Ababa accords were incorporated in the Constitution of Sudan.

Preliminaries and Negotiations
Direct Negotiations between the Government of Sudan and the Southern Sudan Liberation Movement (SSLM) in Addis Ababa were preceded in 1971 by a series of discussions through the intermediation of the  All Africa Conference of Churches (AACC) and  World Council of Churches (WCC).  In Addis Ababa, in 1972, Abel Alier led the delegation representing the Government of Sudan.  Ezboni Mondiri led the delegation of the Southern Sudan Liberation Movement (SSLM).  The negotiations were moderated by Burgess Carr, who was then the Secretary General of the All Africa Conference of Churches.

Results
The Agreement had the goal to address and appease concerns of the southern Sudan liberation and secession movement, as the First Sudanese Civil War grew costly in lives and resources to the northern Sudanese government and southern population. The Addis Ababa Agreement's establishment of the Southern Sudan Autonomous Region gave a degree of autonomy. It meant South Sudan would no longer be divided into the three separate regions Al-Istiwāʾiyyah (Equatoria), Baḥr al-Ghazāl, and Aʿālī al-Nīl (Upper Nile). The region would run itself through a separate legislative and executive body. The soldiers of the Anya Nya would be integrated into the Sudanese army and police force. The Addis Ababa Agreement gave Nimeri popularity and prestige both within Sudan and outside of the country.

A decade of relative peace followed, though the Addis Ababa Agreement failed to dispel the tensions that had originally caused civil war.  The Addis Ababa Agreement proved to be only temporary respite. Resource infringements and marginalisation by the north led to increased unrest in the south starting in the late 1970s.

Termination
In 1983 President Gaafar Nimeiry declared all Sudan an Islamic state under Shari'a law, including the non-Islamic majority southern region. The Southern Sudan Autonomous Region was abolished on 5 June 1983, ending the Addis Ababa Agreement. This initiated the Second Sudanese Civil War (1983–2005).

See also

South Sudan
History of South Sudan
History of Sudan (1956–1969)
History of Sudan (1986–present)

References

Cold War treaties
First Sudanese Civil War
Peace treaties of Sudan
History of Sudan
History of South Sudan
Treaties concluded in 1972
1972 in Sudan
History of Addis Ababa